Biotron may refer to:

 Biotron, a controlled ecological life-support system used for studying a living organism's response to specific environmental conditions or to produce uniform organisms for use in experiments
 Space Environment Simulation Laboratory
 Biotron (Wisconsin), at the University of Wisconsin-Madison
 Biotron (Western University) at the University of Western Ontario run by Norman Hüner and Brian Branfireun
 Phytotron at the California Institute of Technology
 The biotron at the Russian Academy of Sciences's Shemyakin and Ovchinnikov Institute of Bioorganic Chemistry
 The biotron at the University of Alberta
 Biotron Limited, an Austrian biotech company and creator of BIT225
 The robot co-pilot in Micronauts (comics)
 A negative resistance vacuum tube invented by John Scott-Taggart